Tallinn Prison is an Estonian prison, which is located in Soodevahe, Rae Parish, Harju County. Earlier, the prison was located in Magasini Street, Tallinn.

The history of Tallinn Prison begins in 1919 when Patarei Sea Fortress was transformed into a prison (Patarei Prison). In 2000, Patarei Prison become obsolete. Patarei Prison as an institution was moved to the facility on Magasini Street.

In 2004, Maardu Prison was merged to Tallinn Prison.

In 2016 Harku Prison was merged to Tallinn Prison.

References

External links
About Tallinn Prison, vangla.ee

Prisons in Estonia